Imam Turki bin Abdullah Mosque, also known as the Grand Mosque of Riyadh or simply the Grand Mosque, is a mosque in the ad-Dirah neighborhood of Riyadh, Saudi Arabia, located adjacent to Qasr al-Hukm while it overlooks the Deera Square. It was established during the reign of Turki bin Abdullah bin Muhammad al-Saud, the founder and Imam of the Second Saudi State and was later named after him. Seating 17,000 worshippers and measuring 16,800 m2, it is one of the largest mosques in Saudi Arabia.

The exterior and upper portion of the interior is primarily brown Arriyadh Limestone  which appears golden when lit up at night. The lower portion of the interior is in white marble. The structure includes separate men's and women's libraries of 325-m2 each.

The mosque is directly connected from the first floor to Qasr Al-Hukm Palace via two bridges across Assafah Square.

History
A Grand Mosque existed on the site for decades but was rebuilt by the Arriyadh Development Authority and reopened in January 1993.

Architecture 
The minarets of the mosque previously featured a mix of Ottoman and Egyptian styles, with two rectangular sections topped by three rounded sections and a top section coming to a point with round shapes atop it. The courtyard porticos rose in a triangular with decor above. The minarets were however rebuilt in rectangular neo-Najdi style, the courtyard completely resurfaced and the porticos are now a modernized version of their former shape.

See also

 List of mosques in Saudi Arabia

References

External links
 Getty Images for building

1993 establishments in Saudi Arabia
Mosques completed in 1993
Mosques in Riyadh